Pseudohomaloptera sexmaculata is a species of the genus Pseudohomaloptera in the family Balitoridae.

References

Balitoridae
Fish described in 1934